The women's 4 × 200 metre freestyle relay event at the 2012 Summer Olympics took place on 1 August at the London Aquatics Centre in London, United Kingdom.

The U.S. women's team smashed a new Olympic record to recapture their freestyle relay title with the help of a sterling anchor leg from Allison Schmitt. Trailing throughout most of the race with a back-to-back lead from Australia and France before the final exchange, Schmitt demolished the field with a remarkable split of 1:54.09 to deliver the American foursome of Missy Franklin (1:55.96), Dana Vollmer (1:56.02), and Shannon Vreeland (1:56.85) a gold medal and an Olympic record in 7:42.92.

Australia's Bronte Barratt (1:55.76), Melanie Schlanger (1:55.62), and Kylie Palmer (1:56.91) handed Alicia Coutts the anchor duties at the final exchange with a 0.54-second lead, but Coutts' split of 1:56.12 was just over a full-body length behind Schmitt's stunning anchor, leaving them with a silver medal in 7:44.41. Meanwhile, the fantastic French quartet of Camille Muffat (1:55.51), Charlotte Bonnet (1:57.78), Ophélie-Cyrielle Étienne (1:58.05), and Coralie Balmy (1:56.15) took home the bronze in 7:47.49.

Canada's Barbara Jardin (1:57.96), Samantha Cheverton (1:56.91), Amanda Reason (1:59.32), and Brittany MacLean (1:56.46) missed the podium with a fourth-place time in 7:50.65, while Great Britain's home favorite foursome of Caitlin McClatchey (1:58.66), Rebecca Turner (1:57.39), Hannah Miley (1:58.12), and Joanne Jackson (1:58.20) struggled to mount a challenge in an Olympic-medal race as they finished fifth in 7:52.37.  China (7:53.11), led by medley double champion Ye Shiwen, Italy (7:56.30), and Japan (7:56.73) rounded out the championship finale.

Records
Prior to this competition, the existing world and Olympic records were as follows.

The following records were established during the competition:

Results

Heats

Final

References

External links
NBC Olympics Coverage

Women's 4 x 200 metre freestyle relay
4 × 200 metre freestyle relay
2012 in women's swimming
Women's events at the 2012 Summer Olympics